Dayné Peak is a distinctive pyramidal peak,  high, immediately northeast of Cape Errera, the southwest tip of Wiencke Island, in the Palmer Archipelago. It was discovered by the Belgian Antarctic Expedition, 1897–99, under Gerlache, and was named by the French Antarctic Expedition, 1903–05, under Jean-Baptiste Charcot, for Pierre Dayné, a mountain guide and a member of the expedition.

References
 

Mountains of the Palmer Archipelago